Desire is a 1958 Czech anthology film directed by Vojtěch Jasný. It was entered into the 1959 Cannes Film Festival. The film consists of four stories – About a Boy Who Searched for the End of the World, People on Earth and Stars in the Skies, Anděla and Mum

Cast

 Jan Jakeš as Joska Malina
 Václav Babka as Joska's father
 Věra Bublíková as Joska's mother
 Vlastimil Brodský as Novosad
 Jana Brejchová as Lenka
 Jiří Vala as Jan
 František Vnouček as Lenka's father
 Otto Šimánek as Brother-in-law
 Eva Blažková as Tonča
 Věra Tichánková as Anděla
 Václav Lohniský as Michal
 Zdeněk Kutil as Pavelka
 Vladimír Brabec as Municipal office employee
 Vladimír Menšík as Combine driver

References

External links
 

1958 films
Czech anthology films
1950s Czech-language films
Czechoslovak black-and-white films
Films directed by Vojtěch Jasný
1950s Czech films